The Church of Our Lady of Lourdes and Saint Vincent Pallotti, popularly known as Iglesia de Lourdes, is a Roman Catholic parish church in Montevideo, Uruguay.

Overview
Located on the intersection of the streets Paysandú and Florida, the temple was built between 1885 and 1890 by engineer Ignacio Pedralbes in a Neo-Baroque eclectic style, inspired in the churches of La Sorbonne and Saint Gervais in Paris.

The parish was established on 7 September 1962.

Held by the Pallottines, it is dedicated to their patron saint Vincent Pallotti and Our Lady of Lourdes.

References

Ciudad Vieja, Montevideo
Roman Catholic churches completed in 1890
1962 establishments in Uruguay
Roman Catholic church buildings in Montevideo
Baroque Revival architecture in Uruguay
Pallottines
19th-century Roman Catholic church buildings in Uruguay